Interstate 35 (I-35), in the US State of Oklahoma, runs from the Red River at the Texas border to the Kansas state line near Braman for a length of . I-35 has one spur route in the state, I-235 in the inner city of Oklahoma City.

Route description

I-35 enters Oklahoma with U.S. Highway 77 (US-77) on a bridge over the Red River in Love County, south of Thackerville. US-77 splits off at exit 1 (Red River Road) but parallels the Interstate for its entire length in Oklahoma. I-35 maintains a near–due north–south course through Love and Carter counties. I-35 provides four exits to Ardmore. After leaving Ardmore, it has a brief concurrency with State Highway 53 (SH-53) and enters Murray County and the Arbuckle Mountains. I-35 then passes through Garvin County and the county seat of Pauls Valley. North of exit 79 (SH-145), I-35 enters McClain County. There, it passes through Purcell and Goldsby.

SH-9 joins the Interstate crossing over the Canadian River into Cleveland County, after which it splits off again. It then serves as a major urban Interstate in Norman and Moore. Between Norman and Moore, US-77 joins the Interstate again. It then enters Oklahoma City and Oklahoma County near milepost 120. Near downtown, I-35 splits off the mainline (which becomes I-235/US-77) and runs concurrent with I-40 for  before splitting off to the north again. I-44 then joins I-35 between mileposts 133 and 137. In Edmond, US-77 joins the Interstate yet again.

At milepost 146, I-35 enters Logan County. It serves Guthrie at exit 153 (South Division Street), where US-77 splits off, and at exit 157 (SH-33/East Noble Avenue). The Interstate then crosses the Cimarron River into Payne County and enters Noble County shortly thereafter. It provides two exits to Perry and serves as the western terminus of the Cimarron Turnpike (US-412). After providing access to Tonkawa and Blackwell in Kay County, it crosses into Kansas, becoming the Kansas Turnpike.

History
Some sections of I-35 in Oklahoma City were already built in 1953 before the Interstate System was created. Following the passage of the Federal Highway Act of 1956 that created the Interstate Highway System, the Oklahoma Department of Transportation (ODOT) approved the location of the future Interstate north of Oklahoma City to the Kansas state line on a route previously surveyed by the Oklahoma Turnpike Authority for a proposed toll road. As a free road, the first  of that section of I-35 were opened to traffic in 1958 from US-177 near Braman north to the Kansas border, where it continued as the Kansas Turnpike. This was followed by completion of the entire route from Oklahoma City northward to Braman by 1963 in several phases, including Edmond to Guthrie in 1960, Guthrie to Perry in 1961, Perry to Blackwell in 1962, and Blackwell to Braman in early 1963.

To the south of Oklahoma City, I-35 was completed through Norman south to Purcell in June 1959. In Moore, it opened in two parts: the northern half, connecting Moore to Oklahoma City, opened in January 1960. The southern half, linking it to Norman, was opened to traffic in June 1967. The Moore–Norman segment was originally a four-lane section of US-77 built in 1951 that did not meet full Interstate Highway standards and included several at-grade intersections within the City of Moore, including some with traffic signals, and upgraded accordingly to include grade separations to bring up to full Interstate Highway standards and frontage roads to serve local traffic needs. Also not up to full Interstate Highway standards prior to 1967 was a section in the vicinity of Lindsey Street in the southern portion of Norman where another at-grade intersection still existed which dated back to the original highway's construction in the early 1950s—this was also brought up to full Interstate Highway standards in 1967 with the construction of interchanges on I-35 at Lindsey and a short distance to the south for the future SH-9 bypass that would be built around the southside of Norman in the early 1970s.

Further south, I-35 was completed from Marietta south to the Red River bridge in 1963, at which point a nearly  gap of uncompleted Interstate would exist between Purcell and Marietta until the late 1960s with traffic continuing to be routed over paralleling US-77. This was in large part due to efforts of the towns of Wynnewood, Paoli, and Wayne fighting to keep I-35 as close as possible to US-77.

The uncompleted gap of I-35 in Southern Oklahoma was narrowed in 1967 and 1968 when two sections were completed from US-70/SH-199 in Ardmore south to SH-32 in Marietta. In 1969, the section of Interstate bypassing Ardmore was completed north from US-70  to SH-142, and, the following year, 1970, brought the completion of I-35 from SH-7 near Davis south to Ardmore, at long last bypassing the winding section of US-77 through the Arbuckle Mountains. A few months later, in January 1971, I-35 was finally completed across the State of Oklahoma, when the remaining portions of the Interstate from Purcell to SH-7 near Davis were opened to traffic.

In 2008, ODOT announced plans to widen  of I-35 through Norman, from the Main Street interchange (exit 109) to the McCall Bridge over the Canadian River. Controversy surrounding the project arose when early drafts eliminated the SH-74A/Lindsey Street interchange (exit 108B), due to its proximity to the SH-9 interchange (exit 108A). A public meeting held in Norman attracted 300 attendees, many bearing "Don't Close Lindsey" signs. Attendees cited the impact on local businesses and those attending University of Oklahoma football games as grounds for opposing the closure of the interchange. A former OU economics professor estimated the interchange's closure would cost Norman $100 million over the course of 15 years.

At the meeting, four proposals were displayed, only one of which displayed no access from Lindsey Street. A second proposal would preserve access to Lindsey Street but require the seizure of a newly built Chevrolet dealership near the interchange. The third proposal would instead send the ramps around the dealership, and the fourth, the highest-cost alternate, would use bridges to prevent Lindsey Street and SH-9 traffic from conflicting. ODOT said their design standards did not require consideration of OU football traffic, because they only considered the 30th highest traffic percentile. One ODOT engineer was quoted as saying, "Otherwise, we'd have to 10-lane everything in Norman." In early 2011, a solution was unveiled that would retain access to Lindsey Street and reconstruct the interchange without displacing the dealership.

In 2014, ODOT completed reconstruction of the Main Street interchange as a single-point urban interchange (SPUI) and widening of I-35 to just south of Main Street. In March 2015, ODOT began a two-year, $71 million project to reconstruct the Lindsey Street interchange as a SPUI, reconstruct the SH-9 interchange, and complete widening of I-35 to six lanes to the Canadian River. It was completed and opened in October 2017.

In August 2018, construction began for a new bridge for Southwest 34th Street over I-35 in Moore. The road had previously been unconnected due to sections on either side of I-35 ending at the frontage roads for the interstate. During the project, I-35 was briefly shut down after construction debris was blown off the bridge and onto the roadway on April 13, 2019. The overpass was not damaged; the debris that blown off it was scaffolding and plywood. The bridge was completed and opened on November 21, 2019.

It was announced in February 2022 that the speed limit of the freeway would become  from 89th Street in Oklahoma City to just south of the SH-9 interchange in Norman. This change will make the speed limit consistent in the area, where it previously was not (some of the area had  speed limits). All of the new signs were installed by the end of March.

Future
ODOT is currently reconstructing the I-35/I-240 interchange in southeast Oklahoma City in several phases, the first began in 2016.

The I-35 and SH-9 West interchange in Goldsby is also expected to be reconfigured into a Diverging diamond interchange. The new design is expected to "accommodate large volumes of turning traffic by shifting traffic to the left side of a divided roadway through a series of coordinated signals for safer and more efficient left turns."

Naming
Through the Arbuckle Mountains, I-35 is designated as the Honey Creek Pass.
The bridge over the Canadian River is the S.K. McCall Memorial Bridge.
In Moore, I-35 is the Helen Cole Memorial Highway.
In Edmond, I-35 is the Shannon Miller Parkway.

Exit list

References

External links

35
 Oklahoma
Transportation in Love County, Oklahoma
Transportation in Carter County, Oklahoma
Transportation in Murray County, Oklahoma
Transportation in Garvin County, Oklahoma
Transportation in McClain County, Oklahoma
Transportation in Cleveland County, Oklahoma
Transportation in Oklahoma County, Oklahoma
Transportation in Logan County, Oklahoma
Transportation in Payne County, Oklahoma
Transportation in Noble County, Oklahoma
Transportation in Kay County, Oklahoma